Sean Maluta (born September 30, 1988) is an American professional wrestler currently competing on the independent circuit. He made a number of appearances with WWE and took part in the first Cruiserweight Classic.

Professional wrestling career
Maluta has made several appearances for WWE, starting in June 2016 when he was announced as one of 32 men participating in the inaugural Cruiserweight Classic. In his first and only match in the tournament, Maluta was eliminated by Kota Ibushi. Maluta again wrestled for WWE on July 13, this time in their developmental territory NXT, losing to Hideo Itami. The following day, Maluta teamed with fellow CWC participant Mustafa Ali in a dark match, losing to TM61 (Nick Miller and Shane Thorne). The following month, Maluta teamed with Ariya Daivari in a loss to the Bollywood Boyz (Gurv and Harv Sihra), and again lost to the Bollywood Boyz in September, this time teaming with Danny Burch. Maluta again returned to WWE in October, losing to Bobby Roode, once again in NXT. Maluta appeared  on NXT on March 1, 2017, he was squashed by Patrick Clark. Maluta again competed for WWE in January 2017 on 205 Live, first losing in Tajiri's return match, and then to The Brian Kendrick the following week. Maluta returned to NXT on May 17, 2017, losing to Drew McIntyre. Maluta made another appearance the following year on the July 25 edition of NXT losing to Adam Cole.

Personal life

Sean is the nephew of Afa, one half of the Wild Samoans tag team, through Afa's wife. This makes him a blood relation to all Afa's children and grandchildren. Technically, this also makes him distantly related to Roman Reigns, The Rock, Solo Sikoa, Rikishi, and The Usos.

Championships and accomplishments
Full Impact Pro
FIP World Tag Team Championship (1 time, current) – with Jaka
World Xtreme Wrestling
WXW Heavyweight Championship (3 times)
WXW Television Championship (1 time)
WXW Cruiserweight Championship (3 times)
WXW Tag Team Championship (2 times) – with Nick Nero (1) and Afa Jr. (1)
Wild Samoan Tag Team Tournament (2017) – with Afa Jr.

References

External links
 Sean Maluta profile on WWE.com
 

1988 births
21st-century professional wrestlers
Living people
Sportspeople from Staten Island
Professional wrestlers from New York (state)
American people of Samoan descent
American professional wrestlers of Samoan descent
Anoa'i family
Professional wrestlers from New York City